Mayfair is a neighborhood of San Jose, California, located in the Alum Rock district of East San Jose. It is one of San Jose's most historic Chicano/Mexican-American districts and noted for being a center of the Chicano Movement and grassroots activists like Californian civil rights leader César Chávez.

History

Mayfair has been a working-class, Chicano/Mexican-American neighborhood since its foundation in the early 1900s.

Mayfair is best known for its historical association with Californian civil rights activist César Chávez, who lived in the neighborhood in the 1950s and began his career as a grassroots activist at Our Lady of Guadalupe Church in Mayfair.

In the 1960s and 70's, Mayfair became a hub of the Chicano Movement and continues to serve as a center of Chicano art and culture.

In 2008, the Garden of Strength art installation, by artist Fernanda D'Agostino, was installed at the Mayfair Community Center. Divided into three individual art pieces, called Bienvenidos, Garden of Life, and The Three Sisters''', the art installation was inspired by the diversity and the rich cultural history of the Mayfair area and by the spirit of growth embodied in the Mayfair Community Garden adjacent to the site.

Geography

Mayfair is located within East San Jose. It is east of Little Portugal, which it borders at King Road. The Sinclair Freeway (CA-680) forms Mayfair's eastern and southern border, separating it from the King & Story neighborhood to the south and from the Alum Rock district to the east.

Culture

Mayfair is an important center for Chicano art and Chicano/Mexican-American culture. It hosts the Mexican Heritage Plaza, a notable cultural center and school of Chicano/Mexican arts.

The neighborhood hosts the Mayferia'' (portmanteau of "Mayfair" and "feria", Spanish for fair), a celebration of the community and greater East San Jose's Chicano/Mexican heritage.

Education
Mayfair is served by the Alum Rock Union School District, which operates:
César Chávez Elementary School
San Antonio Elementary School

Parks and plazas

Rancho del Pueblo Municipal Golf Course
Mayfair Park
Mayfair Community Gardens
Parque de la Amistad
Mayfair Skatepark 
Zolezzi Park
Mexican Heritage Plaza

Landmarks

The César Chávez Memorial Walkway is a 5-mile long walking path stretching from Plaza de César Chávez in Downtown passes through Paseo de César Chávez at San José State University and onwards to five sites located in Mayfair:
Mexican Heritage Plaza
Mayfair Community Center
César Chávez Elementary School
Our Lady of Guadalupe Church
Chávez Family Home

Gallery

References

External links

Somos Mayfair

Neighborhoods in San Jose, California
Chicano and Mexican neighborhoods in California